The Joseph Cross (German: Josephskreuz) is an observation tower in form of a double cross on the 580-metre-high Großer Auerberg near Stolberg (Harz), Germany. The Joseph Cross is a steel framework construction with a height of 38 metres and a weight of 125 tons, which was built between 20 April 1896 and 9 August 1896. The Joseph Cross was closed for visitors from 1987 to 1990, before being refurbished and reopened.

History 
In the 17th century there was a timber-framed observation tower on the Auerberg that was demolished in 1768 due to disrepair and weather damage.

In 1832, Count Joseph of Stolberg-Stolberg commissioned the Berlin architect, Karl Friedrich Schinkel, to design a new tower, which a carpenter from Stolberg carried out. The topping out ceremony of Schinkel's wooden tower, built in the form of a double cross, was celebrated on 24 September 1833. On 21 June 1834, the tower was officially opened and named the "Joseph Cross" after its client. The tower had no steps and could only be climbed by a ladder. In 1850 the cross-arms had to be renewed. In June 1880, the building was destroyed by lightning during a thunderstorm.

Construction of a new Joseph Cross, designed by Otto Beißwänger, began on 20 April 1896. The tower took its shape of a double-cross from the original by Schinkel, but was, however, designed along the lines of Paris' Eiffel Tower as a steel-framed structure, even components such as the arches between the legs being copied. The cost of 50,000 marks was born by the House of Stolberg and the Harz Club. On 9 August 1896 the new Joseph Cross was inaugurated.

In the 20th Century, the cross rapidly fell into ruin until it was closed to visitors in 1987 due its state of disrepair. In 1989 renovation was started and it was reopened on 28 August 1990.

Gallery

Notes

See also 
 List of towers

External links 

 
 Joseph's Cross at Skyscraperpage.com

Buildings and structures in the Harz
Observation towers in Saxony-Anhalt
Buildings and structures completed in 1960
Towers completed in 1896
Karl Friedrich Schinkel buildings